The 1993 Puerto Rico Open was a women's tennis tournament played on outdoor hard courts at the San Juan Central Park in San Juan in Puerto Rico that was part of the Tier IV category of the 1993 WTA Tour. It was the 11th edition of the tournament and was held from July 26 through August 1, 1993. Seventh-seeded Linda Harvey-Wild won the singles title and earned $27,000 first-prize money.

Finals

Singles
 Linda Harvey-Wild defeated  Ann Grossman 6–3, 5–7, 6–3
 It was Harvey-Wild's 1st singles title of her career.

Doubles
 Debbie Graham /  Ann Grossman defeated  Gigi Fernández /  Rennae Stubbs 5–7, 7–5, 7–5

References

External links
 ITF tournament edition details
 Tournament draws

Puerto Rico Open
Puerto Rico Open (tennis)
Puerto Rico Open, 1993